Monteiroa may refer to:
 Monteiroa (katydid), a genus of katydids in the family Tettigoniidae
 Monteiroa (plant), a genus of plants in the family Malvaceae